Henrietta is an unincorporated community and census-designated place (CDP) in Blair County, Pennsylvania, United States. It was first listed as a CDP prior to the 2020 census.

The CDP is in the southeastern corner of Blair County, in the southeastern corner of North Woodbury Township. It is in the valley of Clover Creek, a northward-flowing tributary of the Frankstown Branch Juniata River, and sits at the western foot of Tussey Mountain.

Demographics

References 

Census-designated places in Blair County, Pennsylvania
Census-designated places in Pennsylvania